Alemañol (a portmanteau formed of Spanish words alemán and español) is a mixed language, spoken by Spanish speakers in German regions, which formed with German and Spanish. It appeared in the 1960s and it is used today by Spaniards, South Americans, and other Latin Americans in German regions. In the same way, it is also spoken by descendants of German settlers in South America, mostly Southern Cone. Alemañol is also spoken by South American residents of German descent in native German-speaking countries. Alemañol is considered a hybrid language by linguists—many actually refer to Alemañol as "Spanish-German code-switching", though there is some influence of borrowing, and lexical and grammatical shifts as well.

Examples

Words 
 der Bahnhof - el Bahnhof - la bánjof  (Station)
 der Keller - el Keller - la quela  (Basement)
 die U-Bahn - la U-Bahn - el uvan (Metro)

Verbs

Expressions 
 no hay que mischear los espraje = man soll die Sprachen nicht vermischen = Languages should not be mixed
 es muy mühsam para mi = es ist äußerst mühsam für mich = This is extremely difficult for me
 puedo tener tu móvil ? = kann ich dein Handy haben ? - me das tu móvil? = Can I have your phone ?
 me tienes un lápiz = hast du einen Bleistift ? - me das un lápiz ? = Do you have a pencil ?

Bibliography 
 Yolanda Mateos Ortega: Esto me suena a 'alemañol'''. 2000, Frecuencia L. Revista de didáctica del español como segunda lengua.
 V. Canicio: Espalemán o alemañol? En: Lebende Sprachen: Zeitschrift für fremde Sprachen in Wissenschaft und Praxis. Fachblatt des Bundesverbandes der Dolmetscher und Übersetzer''.

References 
 Neotinea 

Mixed languages
German language
Spanish language